The 2010 Cupa României Final was the 72nd final of Romania's most prestigious cup competition. The final was played at the Emil Alexandrescu stadium in Iaşi between the Cup's holder, CFR Cluj and FC Vaslui. The trophy was won for the third year in a row by CFR Cluj after penalty kicks.

Route to the final

Match details

References

External links
 Official site 

2010
Cupa
CFR Cluj matches
Cupa Romaniei Final 2010